Calalo is a village in the Croix-des-Bouquets commune in the Croix-des-Bouquets Arrondissement, in the Ouest department of Haiti.

See also
Croix-des-Bouquets, for a list of other settlements in the commune.

References

Populated places in Ouest (department)